Neope pulaha, the veined labyrinth, is a species of satyrine butterfly found in Asia.

Subspecies
Neope pulaha pulaha (Bhutan, Sikkim, Assam to Burma, eastern Nepal and southern Tibet)
Neope pulaha didia Fruhstorfer, 1909 (Taiwan)
Neope pulaha pandyia (Talbot, 1947) (north-western Himalayas, western Nepal)
Neope pulaha emeinsis C.L. Li, 1995 (western Sichuan)
Neope pulaha nuae Huang, 2002 (Yunnan)
Neope pulaha pulahoides (Moore, [1892]) Indochina – may be a good species

References

Satyrini
Butterflies of Indochina
Taxa named by Frederic Moore
Butterflies described in 1858